Dora Creek railway station is located on the Main Northern line in New South Wales, Australia. It serves the City of Lake Macquarie town of Dora Creek opening on 16 August 1889.

It originally had a substantial weatherboard building on Platform 2. This was demolished in the 1990s and replaced with the current lightweight structures.

Platforms & services
Dora Creek has two side platforms. It is serviced by NSW TrainLink Central Coast & Newcastle Line services travelling from Sydney Central to Newcastle.

References

External links
Dora Creek station details Transport for New South Wales

Railway stations in the Hunter Region
Railway stations in Australia opened in 1889
Regional railway stations in New South Wales
Main North railway line, New South Wales
City of Lake Macquarie